Jack Hirschman (December 13, 1933 – August 22, 2021) was an American poet and social activist who wrote more than 100 volumes of poetry and essays.

Biography
 
Hirschman was born in New York City to a Russian Jewish family. He received a B.A. from the City College of New York in 1955 and an M.A. (1957) and Ph.D. (1961) from Indiana University. While attending City College, he worked as a copy boy for the Associated Press. When he was 19, he sent a story to Ernest Hemingway, who responded: "I can't help you, kid. You write better than I did when I was 19. But the hell of it is, you write like me. That is no sin. But you won't get anywhere with it." Hirschman left a copy of the letter with the Associated Press, and when Hemingway killed himself in 1961, the "Letter to a Young Writer" was distributed by the wire service and published all over the world.

In 1954 Hirschman married Ruth Epstein, whom he'd met and dated when they were students at CCNY. Following graduation, Ruth became a program director for KPFK and eventually general manager of Santa Monica public radio station KCRW.  The couple had two children, David and Celia.

In the 1950s and 60s, Hirschman taught at Dartmouth College and the University of California, Los Angeles. During his tenure at UCLA, one of the students enrolled in his class was Jim Morrison, later to be a cofounder and lead vocalist of the American band The Doors.
The Vietnam War, however, put an end to Hirschman's academic career; he was fired from UCLA after encouraging his students to resist the draft. His marriage disintegrated, and he moved to San Francisco in 1973.

For a quarter century, Hirschman roamed San Francisco streets, cafes (including Caffe Trieste, where he has been a regular patron), and readings, becoming an active street poet and a peripatetic activist. Hirschman was also a painter and collagist.

In June 1999, Hirschman married the Swedish poet, writer and artist Agneta Falk.

Hirschman died at his home in San Francisco on August 22, 2021, at age 87.

Poetry

His first volume of poetry, A Correspondence of Americans, published in 1960 by Indiana University Press, included an introduction by Karl Shapiro: "What a relief to find a poet who is not afraid of the vulgar or the sentimental, who can burst out laughing or cry his head off in poetry – who can make love to language, or kick it in the pants."
Among his many volumes of poetry are A Correspondence of Americans (Indiana U. Press, 1960), Black Alephs (Trigram Press, 1969), Lyripol (City Lights, 1976), The Bottom Line (Curbstone, 1988), and Endless Threshold (Curbstone, 1992).
He also translated over two dozen books into English from languages including Hebrew, German, French, Spanish, Italian, Persian, Russian, Albanian, and Greek.

In 2006, Hirschman released his most extensive collection of poems yet, The Arcanes.  Published in Salerno, Italy by Multimedia Edizioni, The Arcanes comprises 126 long poems spanning 34 years.

Additionally, in 2006, Hirschman was appointed Poet Laureate of San Francisco by Mayor Gavin Newsom. In his Poet Laureate inaugural address, Hirschman envisioned creating an International Poetry Festival in San Francisco, reprising a great tradition from the City's literary past.

In July 2007, Friends of the San Francisco Public Library, Mayor Gavin Newsom, Hirschman, and the San Francisco Public Library presented their first San Francisco International Poetry Festival.

Hirschman was named Poet-in-Residence with Friends of the San Francisco Public Library in 2009. Hirschman continued his work supporting the literary community and was the key organizer for the now biennial San Francisco International Poetry Festival.

From 2007 Festival on, Hirschman, in partnership with Friends of the San Francisco Public Library and the San Francisco Public Library, have presented smaller poetry festivals in a variety of languages, including the Latino Poetry Festival, the Vietnamese Poetry Festival, and the Iranian Arts Poetry Festival.

Hirschman curated the Poets 11 Anthology, which collected poetry from each of the City's 11 districts.

Hirschman was a long time mentor to author and actress Amber Tamblyn.

Political views

Hirschman supported the anti-war movement, the Black Panther Party, and advocated for the rights of the unhoused.

According to a 2006 book review, Hirschman was a Stalinist. Hirschman translated the youthful poems of Joseph Stalin into English (Joey: The Poems of Joseph Stalin; Deliriodendron Press, 2001). He was an assistant editor at the left-wing literary journal Left Curve and was a correspondent for The People's Tribune. He was active with the Revolutionary Poets Brigade. Hirschman is profiled in the 2009 documentary Red Poet in which he identifies as a Marxist-Leninist. He stated in an interview with the San Francisco Chronicle, “The most important thing as a poet is that I worked for the Communist movement for 45 years, and the new class of impoverished and homeless people.”

Selected works

Collections
A Correspondence of Americans Indiana University Press, 1960.
(With Franz Kline) Kline Sky, The Zora Gallery, 1965.
Yod, Trigram Press, 1966.
Black Alephs: Poems, 1960-1968, Phoenix Bookshop, 1969.
HNYC, R. Tamblyn Skyline Press, 1971.
The Burning of Los Angeles, J'Ose Press, 1971.
Endless Threshold, Curbstone Press, 1992. 
Front Lines, City Lights Publishers, 2002. 
Only Dreaming Sky, Manic D Press, 2007. 
All That's Left, City Lights Publishers, 2008. 
The Ulitsea Arcane, Nicola Viviani Edizioni, 2012.
Talking Leaves, Sore Dove Press, 2013.
Passion, Provocation and Prophecy, Swimming with Elephants Publications, 2015.
 The Arcanes : 2006-2016 Multimedia Edizioni, 2016.

Editor
Revolutionary Poets Brigade (Volume 1) Caza de Poesía, 2010. 
Poets 11 Anthology 2012  Friends of the San Francisco Public Library, 2016. 
(with Falk, Agneta) Heartfire: 2nd Revolutionary Poets Brigade anthology Kallatumba Press, 2013. 
(with Curl, John) Overthrowing capitalism : a symposium of poets Kallatumba Press, 2014.  
(with Curl, John) Overthrowing capitalism. Volume two, Beyond endless war, racist police, sexist elites Kallatumba Press, 2015. 
(with Curl, John) Overthrowing capitalism. Volume three, Reclaiming community Kallatumba Press, 2016. 
Poets 11 Anthology 2016  Friends of the San Francisco Public Library, 2016. 
(with Curl, John and Falk, Agneta) Overthrowing capitalism. Volume four Kallatumba Press, 2017. 
(with Curl, John) Building Socialism: World Multilingual Poetry from the Revolutionary Poets Brigade Homeward Press, 2020. 
(with Curl, John) Building Socialism, Volume 2 - Fighting Fascism Homeward Press, 2021.

Translator

Artaud, Antonin Antonin Artaud anthology City Lights Publishers, 1965. 
Dalton, Roque, Poemas Clandestinos Clandestine Poems Solidarity Publications, 1984. 
(with Mark Eisner, John Felstiner, Forrest Gander, Robert Hass, Stephen Kessler, Stephen Mitchell, and Alastair Reid) Neruda, Pablo, The Essential Neruda City Lights Publishers, 2004. 
Pasolini, Pier Pablo, In Danger : a Pasolini anthology City Lights Publishers, 2010. 
Sénac, Jean, Citizens of Beauty : Poems of Jean Sénac Michigan State University Press, 2016.

References

External links

Jack Hirschman: A bibliography, by Hirschman and Matt Gonzalez, in the May 24, 2002 San Francisco Call.
Defiant, A Proclamation by Jack Hirschman, and four of Hirschman's poems presented by The InstaPLANET Cultural Universe.

San Francisco International Poetry Festival, by Nirmala Nataraj, July 23, 2009 San Francisco Chronicle

1933 births
2021 deaths
20th-century American male writers
20th-century American poets
21st-century American male writers
21st-century American poets
Activists from the San Francisco Bay Area
American Book Award winners
American communists
American male poets
American people of Russian-Jewish descent
American social activists
City College of New York alumni
Communist poets
Dartmouth College faculty
Indiana University alumni
Jewish American poets
Neo-Stalinists
Outlaw poets
Poets Laureate of San Francisco
University of California, Los Angeles faculty
Writers from New York City
Writers from San Francisco